The Wolfgang Weyrauch Prize is a literary prize in Hesse, Germany named for writer Wolfgang Weyrauch. Established in 1997, the prize is awarded to young writers for their encouragement and includes a stipend in the amount of €8,000.

Winners

 1979: Anna Jonas
 1981: Renate Fueß and Tina Stotz-Stroheker
 1983: Wolf-Dieter Eigner, Klaus Hensel, Barbara Maria Kloos and Rainer René Müller
 1985: Hansjörg Schertenleib and Sabine Techel
 1987: William Totok and Michael Wildenhain
 1989: Lioba Happel, Durs Grünbein and Rainer Schedlinski
 1991: Dirk von Petersdorff and Barbara Köhler
 1993: Dieter M. Gräf and Ludwig Steinherr
 1995: Ulrike Draesner, Thomas Gruber and Christian Lehnert
 1997: Franzobel and Andreas Altmann
 1999: Anja Nioduschewski, Nicolai Kobus, Henning Ahrens
 2001: Mirko Bonné, Maik Lippert, Hendrik Rost
 2003: Marion Poschmann and Nico Bleutge
 2005: Karin Fellner and Hendrik Jackson
 2007: Nora Bossong and Andrea Heuser
 2009: Juliane Liebert and Judith Zander
 2011: Andre Rudolph and Jan Volker Röhnert
 2013: Uljana Wolf and Tobias Roth
 2015: Anja Kampmann and Özlem Özgül Dündar
 2017: Christoph Szalay and Jan Skudlarek
 2019: Charlotte Warsen and Alexandru Bulucz
 2021: Anna Hetzer and Lara Rüter

References

External links 
 Literarischer März official website

Literary awards of Hesse